PACI  may refer to:
 Chalkyitsik Airport (ICAO location indicator: PACI), in Chalkyitsik, Alaska, United States
 Pacific AC Intertie, see also Path 15
 Partnering Against Corruption Initiative (PACI), a global anti-corruption and compliance platform organized by the World Economic Forum
 Partial anterior circulation infarct, a type of ischemic stroke
 Port Arthur Collegiate Institute, a former high school in Thunder Bay, Ontario, Canada
 Parallels Automation for Cloud Infrastructure